FC Mynai or FC Minaj (Futbolnyi klub Mynai) is a Ukrainian football club from Mynai, a suburb of Uzhhorod in the Zakarpattia Oblast. The club currently competes in the Ukrainian Premier League, despite finishing last in the 2020–21 season.

History
The club was founded in 2015 by former customs officials in one of the Uzhhorod suburbs Mynai (Minaj) and played at the city and since 2016 – at the regional level.

The club was admitted to the Professional Football League of Ukraine after passing attestation for the 2018–19 Ukrainian Second League season. In their first professional season, Mynai managed to win Group A of the Second League, which earned them promotion to the Ukrainian First League. However, they lost the Ukrainian Second League Championship Game to Group B winners FC Kremin Kremenchuk.

In the 2019-20 Ukrainian First League season, they finished first, earning them promotion to the Ukrainian Premier League. Since the start of the 2020–21 season they play their home matches in the Avanhard Stadium in Uzhhorod. They still play in the Ukrainian Premier League, despite finishing last in the 2020-2021 season. Instead Olimpik Donetsk (they had finished 13th in the Premier League) were relegated back to the Persha Liha (Second Ukrainian League).

Current squad
As of 6 March 2023

Other players under contract

Out on loan

Honours
Ukrainian First League
Winners (1): 2019–20
Ukrainian Second League
Winners of group A (1): 2019
Ukrainian Football Amateur League
Winners of group 1 (1): 2018
 Zakarpattia Oblast championship
Winners (1): 2017
3rd place (1): 2016
Zakarpattia Cup
Winners (2): 2017, 2018
 Zakarpattia Supercup
Winners (1): 2017

League and cup history

{|class="wikitable"
|-bgcolor="#efefef"
! Season
! Div.
! Pos.
! Pl.
! W
! D
! L
! GS
! GA
! P
!Domestic Cup
!colspan=2|Other
!Notes
|-
| align="center" |2017–18
| align="center" |4th
| align="center" bgcolor=gold|1
| align="center" |16
| align="center" |11
| align="center" |4
| align="center" |1
| align="center" |34
| align="center" |9
| align="center" |37
| align="center" |
| align="center" |
| align="center" |QF
| align="center" bgcolor=lightgreen|Admitted
|-bgcolor=PowderBlue
| align="center" |2018–19
| align="center" |3rd
| align="center" bgcolor=gold|1
| align="center" |27
| align="center" |15
| align="center" |4
| align="center" |8
| align="center" |41
| align="center" |26
| align="center" |49
| align="center" | finals
| align="center" |
| align="center" |
| align="center" bgcolor=lightgreen|Promoted
|-bgcolor=LightCyan
| align="center" |2019–20
| align="center" |2nd
| align="center" bgcolor=gold|1
| align="center" |30
| align="center" |19
| align="center" |5
| align="center" |6
| align="center" |51
| align="center" |27
| align="center" |62
| align="center" bgcolor=tan| finals
| align="center" |
| align="center" |
| align="center" bgcolor=lightgreen|Promoted
|-
| align="center" |2020–21
| align="center" |1st
| align="center" |14
| align="center" |26
| align="center" |4
| align="center" |6
| align="center" |16
| align="center" |16
| align="center" |47
| align="center" |18
| align="center" | finals
| align="center" |
| align="center" |
| align="center" |
|}

List of coaches
2015 Viacheslav Pinkovskyi
2016 Mykola Hibaliuk
2016 Mykhailo Ivanytsia
2017 Mykola Hibaliuk
2018–2019 Ihor Kharkovshchenko
2019  Kirill Kurenko
2019–2021 Vasyl Kobin
2021 Mykola Tsymbal
2021 Vasyl Kobin
2021 Ihor Leonov
2022–present Volodymyr Sharan

Administrative and coaching staff

References

External links
 Official website
 Club's profile at AAFU
 Kachailo, M. Successors of Hoverla. How lives the team of Kopolovets? (Нащадки Говерли…Чим живе команда Кополовця?). UA-Football. 4 May 2018

 
Football clubs in Zakarpattia Oblast
Ukrainian Premier League clubs
2015 establishments in Ukraine
Association football clubs established in 2015